Conoclypus - from the Greek words   (= cone) +  (= disc) - is a genus of sea urchins belonging to the family Conoclypeidae.

Description
These fossil echinoderms are characterized by a conical calcareous structure. They were slow-moving semi-infaunal detritivore, living in the late Eocene until the Miocene.

Distribution
Species of this genus have been found in Miocene of Austria and in Eocene of Germany, Italy, Slovenia and Pakistan.

Species
Conoclypus conoideus (Leske, 1778); Middle Eocene, Europe
Conoclypus pilgrimi Davies, 1927; Lower Eocene, Pakistan 
Conoclypus pinfoldi Gill, 1953; Lower Eocene, Pakistan 
Conoclypus lorioli (Dames, 1877); Eocene, Italy & Slovenia

References 
The Paleobiology Database
Sepkoski, Jack  Sepkoski's Online Genus Databases
Natural History Museum
Vasja Mikuž Eocene sea urchins Conoclypus conoideus from the paleontological collection of the Department of Geology, University in Ljubljana

Clypeasteroida
Fossils of Italy
Eocene animals
Eocene genus first appearances
Miocene genus extinctions